Lac-Akonapwehikan is an unorganized territory in the Laurentides region of Quebec, Canada, one of the eleven unorganized areas in the Antoine-Labelle Regional County Municipality.

See also
List of unorganized territories in Quebec

References

Unorganized territories in Laurentides